The 2013 Kemer Cup was a professional tennis tournament played on indoor hard courts. It was the first edition of the tournament which was part of the 2013 ITF Women's Circuit, offering a total of $50,000 in prize money. It took place in Istanbul, Turkey, on 4–10 November 2013.

Singles entrants

Seeds 

 1 Rankings as of 28 October 2013

Other entrants 
The following players received wildcards into the singles main draw:
  Öykü Boz
  Anastasia Bukhanko
  Hülya Esen
  Ege Tomey

The following players received entry from the qualifying draw:
  Laura-Ioana Andrei
  Elizaveta Kulichkova
  Tereza Smitková
  Viktoriya Tomova

The following players received entry into the singles main draw as lucky losers:
  Kateřina Kramperová
  Nina Zander

Champions

Singles 

  Ksenia Pervak def.  Eva Birnerová 6–4, 7–6(7–4)

Doubles 

  Nigina Abduraimova /  Maria Elena Camerin def.  Tadeja Majerič /  Andreea Mitu 6–3, 2–6, [10–8]

External links 
 2013 Kemer Cup at ITFtennis.com

2013 ITF Women's Circuit
2013 in Turkish tennis